Irvin Pate Hill (December 8, 1908 – November 7, 1978) was an American football running back in the National Football League for the Chicago Cardinals and Boston Redskins.  He attended Trinity University.

References
 

1908 births
1978 deaths
American football running backs
Boston Redskins players
Chicago Cardinals players
People from Fort Worth, Texas